Priporu may refer to several villages in Romania:

 Priporu, a village in Ciuperceni Commune, Gorj County
 Priporu, a village in Vlădeşti Commune, Vâlcea County